Panicum havardii is a species of grass known by the common name Havard's panicgrass. It is native to North America, where it occurs in northern Mexico and Texas and New Mexico in the United States.

This species is a rhizomatous perennial grass with stems up to 63 inches long with an open panicle up to 15 inches long and wide. It grows on sand dunes and in arroyos, where it helps to stabilize areas of open sand. It helps prevent erosion. It provides a forage for cattle when it is young but it is otherwise unpalatable for animals.

References

External links
USDA Plants Profile for Panicum havardii
NatureServe

havardii
Grasses of Mexico
Grasses of the United States
Flora of New Mexico
Flora of Northeastern Mexico
Native grasses of Texas